Troades is a 1986 German-language opera by Aribert Reimann based on Euripides' The Trojan Women. A recording of the premiere featuring Helga Dernesch and Nicole Heesters, conducted by Gerd Albrecht was recorded and issued on LP and CD by EMI. The opera was commissioned by the Bavarian State Opera, Munich.

Roles
Source:

 Hecabe (alto)
 Choir Leader (speaking role)
 Talthybios (baritone)
 Kassandra (mezzo-soprano)
 Andromache (soprano)
 Helena (soprano)
 Menelaus (tenor)
 Athena (speaking role)
 Poseidon (speaking role)

References

1986 operas
Operas by Aribert Reimann
German-language operas
Operas
Operas based on works by Euripides